"Break a Broken Heart" is a song by Australian-Cypriot singer Andrew Lambrou, released on 2 March 2023. The song is set to represent Cyprus in the Eurovision Song Contest 2023 after being internally selected by CyBC, the Cypriot national broadcaster for the Eurovision Song Contest.

Background and composition 
"Break a Broken Heart" was composed by a mix of Danish and Swedish songwriters, namely Jimmy Jansson, and Thomas Stengaard. The song was described as a ballad "about relationships that end with a broken heart but in the end they might very well push us to rise again from the ashes, even stronger."

Release 
The music video for the song was released on 2 March 2023 on Panik Records' official YouTube channel. The release on digital platforms was released on the same day.

Eurovision Song Contest

Selection 
The Cypriot broadcaster CyBC continued to internally select the Cypriot entry for the Eurovision Song Contest 2023, in conjunction with Panik Records. On 17 October 2022, CyBC announced that they had selected Australian-Cypriot singer Andrew Lambrou to represent Cyprus in Liverpool. Lambrou had previously attempted to represent Australia at the Eurovision Song Contest in 2022, placing seventh in the national final Eurovision – Australia Decides 2022 with the song "Electrify."

At Eurovision 
According to Eurovision rules, all nations with the exceptions of the host country and the "Big Five" (France, Germany, Italy, Spain and the United Kingdom) are required to qualify from one of two semi-finals in order to compete for the final; the top ten countries from each semi-final progress to the final. The European Broadcasting Union (EBU) split up the competing countries into six different pots based on voting patterns from previous contests, with countries with favourable voting histories put into the same pot. On 31 January 2023, an allocation draw was held, which placed each country into one of the two semi-finals, and determined which half of the show they would perform in. Cyprus has been placed into the second semi-final, to be held on 11 May 2023, and has been scheduled to perform in the first half of the show.

References 

2023 songs
2023 singles
Eurovision songs of 2023
Eurovision songs of Cyprus